Sammy Solitaire Siddharta Skytte (born 20 February 1997) is a Danish professional footballer who plays as a midfielder for Romanian club Concordia Chiajna.

Youth career
Skytte started playing football at Silkeborg KFUM at the age of 8, before signing a youth contract in 2012 with Silkeborg IF.

Club career

Silkeborg IF
Skytte is a product of Silkeborg IF and has played for the club since he was a kid. Skytte signed his first senior contract 12 August 2015, at the age of 18, after sitting on the bench for the first team in a game against Lyngby BK.

Skytte got his debut for Silkeborg IF on 22 September 2015. Though his young age, he played 5 matches in the rest of the season in the Danish 1st Division. Skytte suffered from a shoulder injury in May 2016 and went through an operation, that kept him out for the rest of the season.

From the summer 2016, Skytte started to play on full-time with the rest of the squad, after completing his school. His contract got extended in December 2016 until 2019. This extension emphasized his important role on the team.

Midtjylland
FC Midtjylland announced the signing of Skytte on a five-year contract, on 13 June 2018. Skytte was immediately loaned out to AC Horsens. Silkeborg IF later revealed, that FCM had triggered his purchase clause that was set to 3.7 million danish krone.

On 8 July 2019, Skytte was loaned out to Norwegian club Stabæk Fotball.

Bodø/Glimt
Without making a single appearance for Midtjylland, the club confirmed on 25 February 2020, that Skytte had signed a 5-year contract with Norwegian club FK Bodø/Glimt.

Return to Stabæk
On 11 September 2020, Skytte returned to Stabæk, which he played for on loan in 2019. Skytte signed a contract until the end of 2023. After 45 official appearances and three goals for Stabæk, the club announced on 31 March 2022, that Skytte's contract had been terminated by mutual consent.

Career statistics

Club

Personal life
Skytte is the cousin of american footballplayer, Andreas Knappe.

Honours

Club
Bodø/Glimt
Eliteserien (1):  2020

References

External links
 
 Sammy Skytte at DBU

Living people
1997 births
Association football midfielders
Denmark youth international footballers
Denmark under-21 international footballers
Danish men's footballers
Danish expatriate men's footballers
Danish 1st Division players
Danish Superliga players
Eliteserien players
Liga II players
Silkeborg KFUM players
Silkeborg IF players
FC Midtjylland players
AC Horsens players
Stabæk Fotball players
FK Bodø/Glimt players
CS Concordia Chiajna players
Expatriate footballers in Norway
Danish expatriate sportspeople in Norway
Expatriate footballers in Romania
Danish expatriate sportspeople in Romania
People from Silkeborg
Sportspeople from the Central Denmark Region